In chemistry,  a sigma complex or σ-complex usually refers to a family of coordination complexes where one or more ligand interacts with the metal using the bonding electrons in a sigma bond.  Dihydrogen complexes are examples.  Transition metal silane complexes are often especially stable sigma complexes. A subset of sigma complexes are agostic complexes, where a C-H sigma bond functions as the donor ligand.  In some cases, even C-C bonds function as sigma ligands.  Sigma complexes are of great mechanistic significance, despite their frequent fragility.  They represent an initial interaction between the metal center and saturated substrates.  Sigma complexes are generally assumed to be intermediates prior to full oxidative addition.

References

Transition metals
Metal hydrides